The statue of John of Nepomuk is installed at Vyšehrad in Prague, Czech Republic.

External links

 

Monuments and memorials in Prague
Outdoor sculptures in Prague
Sculptures of men in Prague
Statues in Prague
Christian sculptures